The 1996–97 Alpha Ethniki was the 61st season of the highest football league of Greece. The season began on 6 September 1996 and ended on 25 May 1997. Olympiacos won their 26th Greek title and their first one in ten years.

Teams

Stadia and personnel

 1 On final match day of the season, played on 25 May 1997.
 2 Velimir Zajec was leaved the Panathinaikos spot before the last round, so Karoulias took their place for the last match.

League table

Results

Top scorers

External links
Official Greek FA Site
RSSSF
Greek SuperLeague official Site
SuperLeague Statistics
 

Alpha Ethniki seasons
Greece
1